St Mary's Church is a Roman Catholic church in Madeley, Shropshire, England. It was built from 1852 to 1853 and was designed by Joseph Hansom in the Gothic Revival style. It is located on the corner of the High Street and Hanover Close. From 1769, the church congregation went to the presbytery next to the church, where Catholic Mass was celebrated in secret in a chapel. According to Historic England, it "is a very rare survivor of a house," and a Grade II listed building.

History

Massing House

After the Reformation, Madeley continued having a local Catholic community. In 1676, it was recorded that there were 51 adult "papists" living in Madeley. This number was the highest amount of Catholics in Shropshire. The Catholic community was supported by the Brooke family, the descendents of Robert Broke. There was a secret school and a chapel at the Brooke home, Madeley Court. Madeley became a Catholic centre from which other Catholic missions were started in the surrounding area, and became known as "the Mother mission of Shropshire". In 1760, the Giffard family donated the current site of the church. They were descendants of John Giffard, and relatives of the Giffards who behind the construction of St Peter and St Paul's Church, Wolverhampton. In 1769, the current house was built on the site, which had a chapel at the back. The house chapel was used to celebrate Mass and became known as the Massing House. The house chapel cost £500 to build and some of the cost was paid for by the Duke of Norfolk.

St Mary's Church
In 1849, Fr W. Molloy began serving the mission. The chapel initially had a capacity of 200 people. However, by 1851, attendance for Sunday Mass was closer to 500, so a larger church needed to be built. On 21 April 1852, the foundation stone was laid. The church was designed by Joseph Hansom and was situated behind the house. On 18 August 1853, the church was opened. In September 1882, Missionaries of the Sacred Heart moved into the house and served the church. In 1889, while the church was served by the priest at St Mary's Church in Shifnal, the house became a girls boarding school. In 1969, the house again became a presbytery and later used by the parish.

Parish
St Mary's Church is part of the parish of the Good Shepherd with St Paul's Church in Dawley. St Mary's Church has two Sunday Masses at 5:00pm on Saturday and at 11:00am on Sunday. St Paul's Church has one Sunday Mass at 9:00am.

See also
 Diocese of Shrewsbury
 Listed buildings in Madeley, Shropshire

References

External links
 
 

Buildings and structures in Telford
Roman Catholic churches in Shropshire
Grade II listed buildings in Shropshire
Gothic Revival church buildings in England
Gothic Revival architecture in Shropshire
19th-century Roman Catholic church buildings in the United Kingdom
1769 establishments in England
Religious organizations established in 1769
Roman Catholic churches completed in 1853
Buildings by Joseph Hansom